Dhara Jagannadhapuram is a village in Rowthulapudi Mandal, Kakinada district in the state of Andhra Pradesh in India.

Geography 

Demographics 
 India census, Dhara Jagannadhapuram had a population of 740, out of which 389 were male and 1359 were female. The population of children below 6 years of age was 115. The literacy rate of the village was 49.12%.

References 

Villages in Rowthulapudi mandal